Virginia Cleaver Bacon (February 1, 1883 - April 11, 1930) was Oregon State Librarian.

Early life
Virginia Cleaver Bacon was born on February 1, 1883, in Halsey, Oregon, the daughter of Alonzo and Laura Cleaver. Her sister was the author Kay Cleaver Strahan.

She graduated from Portland High School and obtained an A. B. at University of Oregon. In 1914 she graduated from the Riverside School of Library Service in California and in 1924 she obtained an A. M. at American University.

Career
She was prominent in library work in California, Missouri and Washington, D.C.

She was advisor in Adult Education at the Portland Public Library and established the first department of its kind on the Pacific Coast and made the work so outstanding that it was quickly adopted elsewhere. She later became Oregon State Librarian in 1929.

In 1905 she was assistant for English Literature at University of Oregon. 

In 1909 she was the Editor of the Bonville Western Monthly, published in Portland Oregon.

Between 1913 and 1916, her short fiction was published in numerous magazines, including "In an Oregon Orchard," Sunset: The Magazine of the Pacific and All of the Far West, 1913; "Trail Song," Out West, p.39, 1915; and "on Fickle Hill," and "Romany Song," The Overland Monthly, 1916.

Her short story "The Path-Treader" was published in Scribner's Magazine Volume 72 in 1922 and included in the Best American Short Stories 1923.

From 1915 to 1921 she was librarian at Humboldt State Teacher's College of California. In 1921 she was librarian at Park College, Missouri. She was assistant director of the Junior Division at the United States Employment Service, in Washington, D. C.. Since 1925 she was a member of Portland Library staff. She wrote short stories, poems and articles for the most prominent national magazines.

She was the author of "Every Day English". In 1925 she co-authored Vocational guidance and junior placement: twelve cities in the United States. In 1928 she published Good English. Good English was a booklet for the Reading with a Purpose series of the American Library Association. Specialists were called on to write the 45 booklets in the series and of that number only two were written by women and only four by librarians.

She was a member of the Phi Beta Kappa, American Association of University Women, Professional Women's League, American Library Association, American Association for Adult Education.

Personal life
Virginia Cleaver Bacon lived in California and Washington, D. C., and lastly moved to 1084 Wilson St., Portland, Oregon. She married Condon Roy Bean in 1905.  This marriage ended in divorce.  She married Ralph Bacon in 1910.

She died on April 11, 1930, in Portland.

References

People from Halsey, Oregon
1883 births
1930 deaths
American librarians
American women librarians
University of Oregon alumni